The 2016 Democratic Party pre-election primaries are to select the Democratic Party's candidates for the 2016 Legislative Council election. The candidacy was decided 60% by opinion polling, 20% by party's district branches and 20% by each district's district councillors and finalised in a voting in the special party congress on 24 April 2016. Seven candidate lists were decided in which James To, Helena Wong and Wu Chi-wai would seek for re-election in their respective constituencies, while chairwoman Emily Lau, Albert Ho and Sin Chung-kai would retire and succeeded by new faces Lam Cheuk-ting, Roy Kwong, Ted Hui and Andrew Wan.

Background
The Democratic Party has held intra-party primaries according to the opinion polls in the previous Legislative Council elections. In the previous mechanism, the candidacy was decided 60% by opinion polling, 20% by party's district branches and 20% by each district's district councillors. It was reverted to 8:1:1 after the 2004 Legislative Council election due to the criticism of too much influence of the party.

The unprecedented primary proposal was suggested by chairwoman Emily Lau to hold public debates to select the candidacy before the party's voting. Lau said her idea was borrowed from the United States presidential primaries and believed such forums, which would be open to the public and the press, would greatly increase the transparency of the races. The plan of public debates were later cancelled.

The annual party congress on 6 December 2015 primarily agreed on the pre-election primary proposal. On the congress, the party's electoral committee suggested to have only one ticket for each geographical constituency while two for the District Council (Second) "super seats". Former legislator Lee Wing-tat who lost in New Territories West expressed the worry of losing both lists if the party put forward two candidate lists as they did in the 2012 Legislative Council election. Zachary Wong Wai-yin, veteran Yuen Long District Council member suggested to modify the maximum candidate list for New Territories West and New Territories East from one to two, which agreed by 2012 New Territories West candidate Josephine Chan Shu-ying. The motion eventually passed with 62 for 61 against. The idea of fielding two lists in New Territories East and West was eventually dismissed by many as too risky.

The pre-election primary mechanism was also reverted to the pre-2004 6:2:2 ratio with 81 for 37 against to help the non-incumbent candidates who is disadvantaged by in the opinion polls compared to the publicity of the incumbent candidates would enjoy.

Candidates
After the nomination period from 10 to 31 December, a total number of 14 nominations was received. The nominations surprised the media as long-time legislator and incumbent chairwoman Emily Lau decided not to run for an eighth term. The other incumbents who would not seek for re-election included Albert Ho of District Council (Second) and Sin Chung-kai of Hong Kong Island. Another surprise was the two rising stars Southern District Councillors Lo Kin-hei, who is also party's vice chairman, and Henry Chai Man-hon, have both given up contesting the Legislative Council elections.

Hong  Kong Island
 Winfield Chong Wing-fai, four-time candidate of the Central and Western District Council election
 Ted Hui Chi-fung, Central and Western District Council member

Kowloon West
 Helena Wong Pik-wan, incumbent Legislative Council member for Kowloon West
 Ramon Yuen Hoi-man, Sham Shui Po District Council member and Kowloon West Branch chairman

Kowloon East
 Wu Chi-wai, incumbent Legislative Council member for Kowloon East and Wong Tai Sin District Council

New Territories West
 Josephine Chan Shu-ying, former Tuen Mun District Council member (1994–2015)
 Roy Kwong Chun-yu, Yuen Long District Council member and romance novelist (withdrawn in April 2016)
 Andrew Wan Siu-kin, vice chairman of the Democratic Party and former Kwai Tsing District Council member (2004–2015)

New Territories East
 Au Chun-wah, Tai Po District Council member
 Lam Cheuk-ting, chief executive officer of the Democratic Party and North District Council member
 Joanne Leung Wing-yan, LGBT activist

District Council (Second)
 Ted Hui Chi-fung, Central and Western District Council member (withdrew in January 2016)
 Roy Kwong Chun-yu, Yuen Long District Council member and romance novelist
 James To Kun-sun, incumbent Legislative Council member for District Council (Second) and Yau Tsim Mong District Council member

Results

References

2016 in Hong Kong
2016 elections in China
Democratic Party (Hong Kong)
Primary elections in Hong Kong